Kerrie Anne Greenland is an Australian actress and singer, known for performances in musical theatre. She won the Helpmann Award for Best Female Actor in a Supporting Role in a Musical for her portrayal of Éponine in the 2014 Australian version of Les Miserables.

Career

Greenland graduated from the Western Australian Academy of Performing Arts in 2012, before making her professional debut as Éponine in the 2014 Australian revival of Les Miserables. For this role she received the Helpmann Award for Best Female Actor in a Supporting Role in a Musical. She went on to perform the same role in the show's International Tour (Manila and Singapore) in 2016. Subsequent roles included Violet Hilton in Side Show at the Hayes Theatre in Sydney and Cassandra in Paris: A Rock Oddysey.

Greenland released her debut album, Pictures, in March 2016, and staged a related solo concert, Pictures: Songs from Movie Musicals at Chapel Off Chapel Melbourne, on 2 June 2018. Later that year she toured Australia as Patsy Cline in Always... Patsy Cline, and in September she portrayed Esther Smith in  musical theatre version of Meet Me in St. Louis. She also originated the character Dom, one of the leads in a new musical, The Things Between Us, which was staged in New Zealand.

References

External links

Australian stage actresses
Living people
1989 births